The men's light middleweight event was part of the boxing programme at the 1988 Summer Olympics. The weight class allowed boxers of up to 71 kilograms to compete. The competition was held from 20 September to 2 October 1988. 36 boxers from 36 nations competed.

19-year-old Roy Jones Jr. of the U.S. dominated his opponents, never losing a single round en route to the final. In the final, he controversially lost a 3–2 decision to South Korean fighter Park Si-Hun, four years his senior, despite pummeling Park for three rounds and landing 86 punches to Park's 32.

Medalists

Results
The following boxers took part in the event:

First round
 Segundo Mercado (ECU) def. Kofi Emmanuel Quaye (GHA), KO-3
 Raymond Downey (CAN) def. Jorge López (ARG), 5:0
 Norbert Nieroba (FRG) def. Garth Felix (GRN), KO-1
 Abrar Hussain (PAK) def. Noureddine Meziane (ALG), KO-2
 François Mayo (CMR) def. Moussa Viavindi (RCA), RSC-1

Second round
 Peter Silva (BRA) def. Charles Mahlalela (SWZ), 5:0
 Rey Rivera (PUR) def. George Allison (GUY), 5:0
 Richard Woodhall (GBR) def. Desmond Williams (SLE), 5:0
 Apolinario Silveira (ANG) def. Mohamed Orungi (KEN), RSC-2
 Michal Franek (TCH) def. Isaack Impatu (VAN), walk-over
 Roy Jones Jr. (USA) def. M'tendere Makalamba (MLW), KO-1
 Yevgeni Zaytsev (URS) def. Gary Smikle (JAM), 5:0
 Sounaila Sagnon (BUR) def. John Bosco Waigo (UGA), RSC-1
 Park Si-Hun (KOR) def. Abdullah Ramadan (SUD), RSC-2
 Torsten Schmitz (GDR) def. Angel Stoyanov (BUL), 3:2
 Quinn Paynter (BER) def. Johnny de Lima (DEN), RSC-3
 Vincenzo Nardiello (ITA) def. Likou Aliu (SAM), KO-3
 Martin Kitel (SWE) def. Ncholu Monontsi (LES), 5:0
 Segundo Mercado (ECU) def. Vaban Banko (ZAI), 5:0
 Raymond Downey (CAN) def. Norbert Nieroba (FRG), 3:2
 Abrar Hussain (PAK) def. François Mayo (CMR), RSC-2

Third round
 Rey Rivera (PUR) def. Peter Silva (BRA), KO-1
 Richard Woodhall (GBR) def. Apolinario Silveira (ANG), 5:0
 Roy Jones Jr. (USA) def. Michal Franek (TCH), 5:0
 Yevgeni Zaytsev (URS) def. Sounaila Sagnon (BUR), RSC-2
 Park Si-Hun (KOR) def. Torsten Schmitz (GDR), 5:0
 Vincenzo Nardiello (ITA) def. Quinn Paynter (BER), KO-2
 Martin Kitel (SWE) def. Segundo Mercado (ECU), 3:2
 Raymond Downey (CAN) def. Abrar Hussain (PAK), 5:0

Quarterfinals
 Richard Woodhall (GBR) def. Rey Rivera (PUR), 5:0
 Roy Jones Jr. (USA) def. Yevgeni Zaytsev (URS), 5:0
 Park Si-Hun (KOR) def. Vincenzo Nardiello (ITA), 3:2
 Raymond Downey (CAN) def. Martin Kitel (SWE), 5:0

Semifinals
 Roy Jones Jr. (USA) def. Richard Woodhall (GBR), 5:0
 Park Si-Hun (KOR) def. Raymond Downey (CAN), 5:0

Final
 Park Si-Hun (KOR) def. Roy Jones Jr. (USA), 3:2

Judges Zaur Gvadzhava of the Soviet Union and Sándor Pajar of Hungary each voted for Jones, 60–56, on the 20-point must system. Alberto Duran of Uruguay and Hiouad Larbi of Morocco voted for Park, each by 59–58. Bob D. Kasule of Uganda gave 59–59 a draw, but decided that Park was more aggressive. As the decision was highly controversial, it eventually led the Olympic authorities to introduce a new high-tech scoring system, which in turn was intended to eliminate biased judging.

References

Light Middleweight